Block'hood is a city-building video game developed by Plethora Project and published by Devolver Digital. It was released on 11 May 2017 for Microsoft Windows, MacOS and Linux.

Gameplay
Block'hood is a neighbourhood building simulator. It involves building a vertical tower for people to live in by combining square building blocks. There are over 200 different building blocks each serving different purposes and requiring different resources. Every block has inputs which are resources it consumes and outputs which are resources it produces. Resources such as Energy and Food must be managed, and if a building block doesn't have all its required resources it will decay and need to be replaced. To produce more resources blocks such as Wind Turbines, Farms and Water towers can be built. Other blocks that are available include: Flats which can house inhabitants, Parks that provide fresh air, Shops that produce money and Clinics that reduce sickness.

The game is intended to be partially educational so it incorporates real world mechanics. When building all blocks must be accessible which can be achieved by adding stairs and corridors. The buildings must also be architecturally sound, for example corridors must be supported before they can built upon.

There is a story mode with 5 chapters that also serves as the initial tutorial to the game. Additional tutorials are included that cover more complex mechanics of the game. There is a challenge mode where there are 24 challenges to complete, which involve producing a specified number of resources given a limited amount of money or other resources. The sandbox mode allows a neighbourhood to be built in an area of customisable size, inhabitants demands and random events can be left on or turned off in this mode.

Development
Block'hood was first released for early access on 10 March 2016 for Microsoft Windows and MacOS. On 13 March 2016, a bug fix was published. On 30 March 2016, new features were released including a new UI to inspect block properties, Pigs and Cows were added as well as new farms. On 27 April 2016, Inhabitants were added to the game along with new building blocks. On 25 May 2016, more inhabitants were added, as well as new challenge levels and more new building blocks. Plethora Project went to E3 in June 2016 to represent the game on MacOS. The game won an award for Best Gameplay at the "Games for Change" festival in June 2016. More new features including a world system enabling a larger neighbourhoods were released on 11 July 2016. On 11 August 2016, an update improving the menu system and user interface was released. On 14 October 2016, all 200 building blocks were available and dynamic effects like wind and rain were published. On 5 December 2016, inhabitants demands were added. The first Linux version of the game was released on 18 December 2016. The full version of the game was released on 11 May 2017, which included a new story game mode. Further bug fixes were applied on 11 and 21 July 2017. The game is built on the Unity3D game engine.

Reception
Cogconnected gave the game, 70 out of 100, Destructoid gave the game, 7 out of 10 Digitally Downloaded gave the game, 5 out of 5. Hey Poor Critic gave the game, 3 out of 5.

Based on 6 reviews, the score from Metacritic is 75 out of 100.

References

External links
Block'hood on Steam
Plethora Project
Best Gameplay Awards

2017 video games
Indie video games
Simulation video games
City-building games
Strategy video games
Video games developed in the United States
Windows games
MacOS games
Linux games